Elizabeth Gorcey (born January 1, 1962) is an American filmmaker, actress, and writer. She has held leading roles in films such as Kidco and Footloose while also producing and directing films which include Just Another Man's Story and Breast Pump & Blender. She is also the author of the children's book series Liv on Life.

Early life and education

Gorcey was raised in Long Branch, New Jersey and attended Long Branch High School. She was interested in acting at a young age, but began by focusing on painting and sculpting. She also sang with the Metropolitan Opera Company.
 
Gorcey graduated high school at the age of 16 and went on to the American Conservatory Theater on a summer scholarship. She attended the University of Arizona and Monmouth University.

Career

In her early career, Gorcey gave summer stock theater performances at The Barn Theatre in Michigan, including in the productions of "Carousel," "Damn Yankees" and "My Fair Lady." After her first year, she returned to New Jersey where she obtained her real estate license, returning the following summer for more acting.  
 
Her first leading roles in film came as June Cessna in the film Kidco, and Wendy Jo in the 1984 film Footloose. She went on to act in films such as Teen Wolf and television shows such as Highway to Heaven.
 
Her acting led to a film career of directing and producing. She directed the 2012 documentary Adopting Ginny, and produced and directed the award winning documentary Just Another Man's Story.
 
Outside of film, Gorcey is the author of the children's book series Liv on Life. The series was inspired by her daughter and grew into a lifestyle brand of products. She is also an artist and has conducted workshops as part of her charitable work.

Filmography

Filmmaker

Acting

Personal life 

Gorcey is the second cousin to stage and film actor Leo Gorcey.

References

External links
 
 

1962 births
Living people
American film actresses
21st-century American women writers
Actors from New Jersey
Long Branch High School alumni
Monmouth University alumni
People from Long Branch, New Jersey
Actresses from New Jersey
University of Arizona alumni
21st-century American actresses
Writers from New Jersey
Sculptors from New Jersey
American women painters
Painters from New Jersey
21st-century American painters
American women sculptors
20th-century American actresses
20th-century American painters
20th-century American sculptors
Film directors from New Jersey
Film producers from New Jersey
American television actresses
21st-century American sculptors
American documentary film producers
American voice actresses
American women documentary filmmakers
American documentary film directors